The Chacarera is a dance and music that originated in Santiago del Estero, Argentina. It is a genre of folk music that, for many Argentines, serves as a rural counterpart to the cosmopolitan imagery of the Tango. A dance form played by contemporary musicians as soloists or in small ensembles of voice, guitar, violin and bombo drum, the Chacarera is often legitimized by its “origin” in the remote province of Santiago del Estero.

Chacarera music
While much of the Chacarera repertoire can be traced to the 1920s sheet music of Andrés Chazarreta (Chazarreta 1947[1916]), the contemporary Chacarera style described in this article was standardized by the recordings of the 1950s folk group Los Hermanos Ábalos (Ábalos 1952). Today, this style is ubiquitous throughout Argentina, with important variants appearing in the provinces of Santiago del Estero and Salta.

Melody and harmony
Contemporary Chacareras generally utilize descending, minor-mode melodies within an octave range. They are not harmonically distinctive, relying predominantly on tonic and dominant accompaniment, and the occasional shift to the relative major. Some modern Chacarera musicians use major-seventh and other altered chords in their arrangements.

Rhythm
Contemporary Chacarera music is distinguished by its unique hemiola syncopation. Melody lines tend to begin in duple meter, and conclude in triple meter. The downbeat is generally elided until cadences, a characteristic that is particularly salient in the case of the “Chacarera Trunca” style, which cadences on the third beat.

Structure
The Chacarera is a binary form. The A section (6 or 8 bars) doubles as an introduction and an interlude. The B section (8 bars) returns twice before concluding with a repetition. The entire form repeats two times.    
A	B	A	B	A	B	B

Chacarera choreography
The Chacarera is a Contradance-influenced partner dance with similarities to many Ibero-American folk dances, including the Chilean (Zama) cueca and the Peruvian Marinera (Vega 1944). Male dancers circle about their female partners, seducing them with foot stomping (zapateo) and handkerchief waving during the A sections and “coronating,” or embracing, them in the final B section.

History of the Chacarera genre

According to the musicologist Carlos Vega (Vega 1944), the Chacarera belongs to a family of Ibero-American dances derived from baroque Contradance choreography. While this assertion may be accurate, Vega himself admits to the absence of documentation regarding the Chacarera before the advent of the recording industry. As the first mention of the Chacarera as a musical genre appears in the early twentieth century publications of the Santiagueñan band leader Andrés Chazarreta, it may thus be more accurate to place this dance’s “origin” within the modern era.

Argentine musical nationalism
The Chacarera can be understood as an outgrowth of Argentine "nativism," a nationalist "back-to-the-roots" movement inspired by increasing Argentine urbanization, and the influence of romantic European philosophy (Delaney 2002). The musical impact of “nativism” was felt particularly strongly in the rural province of Santiago del Estero, a region identified as a wellspring of “authentic” Argentine culture (Rojas 1905). Both Argentine individuals and institutions were inspired by the nativist perspective. In 1911, the Santiagueñan band leader Andrés Chazarreta established the nation’s first folk music “ballet” (Compañía de bailes nativos) (Vega 1981). In 1917, meanwhile, the Universidad de Tucumán hired the pianist Manuel Gómez Carrillo to conduct ethnomusicological research in Santiago (Veniard 1999). Chazarreta and Carrillo’s publications are the first to mention the Chacarera as a musical genre. While both musicians claimed to be replicating “folk” traditions in their books and recordings, some scholars credit them with establishing the form and choreography of the dance (Chazarreta 2007).

Impact of the recording industry
The Chacarera recordings and compositions of Manuel Gómez Carrillo and Andrés Chazarreta have provided a foundation for recording artists throughout the twentieth century, including Atahualpa Yupanqui, Los Hermanos Abalos, and more recent musical ensembles like the Dúo Coplanacu, Peteco Carabajal and La Chacarerata Santiagueña. The distribution of these recordings via record and radio has led to the establishment of  local, national, and international audiences for the genre. In Santiago del Estero, Mendoza, and Buenos Aires alike, musicians gather in Peñas, or small folkloric clubs, to sing and dance their favorite Chacareras, often with specific regional flare. In neighboring nation-states including Uruguay, Perú, Brazil, Bolivia and Chile, Chacarera recordings of artists like Yupanqui are well-known, and often incorporated into local repertoires.

Chacarera as art music
The Chacarera also provided inspiration for art music composers like Alberto Ginastera, who used the genre’s distinctive syncopations frequently in his work. Manuel Gómez Carrillo himself was a conservatory-trained pianist, and set a precedent for this kind of “academic” setting in his compositions for solo piano.

Some famous chacareras
Añoranzas (Julio Argentino Gerez) (A "chacarera doble")
Chacarera de las Piedras (Yupanqui)
La Olvidada (Yupanqui)
La Vieja (Hermanos Ábalos)
Chacarera del rancho (Hermanos Ábalos)
Chacarera Santiagueña (Los Tucu Tucu)

See also
 List of dances
 Music of Argentina
 Latin American folklore
 Gato

References

Bibliography
 Abalos, Adolfo. 1952. Hermanos Abalos: primer álbum para piano. Buenos Aires: Editorial de los Hermanos Abalos.
 Abecasis, Alberto. 2004. La Chacarera bien mensurada. Río Quarto: Universidad Nacional de Río Quarto.
 Carlson, Julius Reder. 2011. "The 'Chacarera Imaginary': 'Santiagueñan' Folk Music and Folk Musicians in Argentina." Doctoral dissertation. University of California, Los Angeles.
 Carlson, Julius Reder. 2005. “La Olvidada: discurso y práctica guitarrística como constructores de la Chacarera.” M.A. thesis. Santiago de Chile: Universidad de Chile.
 Chazarreta, Andrés. 2007. “La evolución coreográfica de la Chacarera.” M.A. thesis. Buenos Aires: Universidad de Buenos Aires.
 Chazarreta, Andrés. 1947 (1916). Primer álbum musical santiagueño de piezas criollas coleccionadas por Andrés A. Chazarreta. Buenos Aires: Talleres Gráficos “Garrot”..
 Chazarreta, Andrés. 1941. Coreografía descriptiva de las danzas nativas. Buenos Aires: Natalio Héctor Pirovano.
 Delaney, Jean H. 2002. “Imagining ‘El Ser Argentino’: Cultural Nationalism and Romantic Concepts of Nationhood in Early Twentieth-Century Argentina.” Journal of Latin American Studies 34(3): 625-658.
 Rojas, Ricardo. 1905. El país de la selva. Buenos Aires: Editorial Guillermo Kraft.
 Vega, Carlos. 1944. Panorama de la música popular Argentina. Buenos Aires: Editorial Losada.
 Vega, Carlos. 1981. Apuntes para la historia del movimiento tradicionalista argentino. Buenos Aires: Editorial Losada.
 Veniard, Juan M. 1999. Estudios y documentos referentes a Manuel Gómez Carillo, Vol. 1. Buenos Aires: Academia de Ciencias y Artes de San Isidro.

External links
 Strum guitar for chacarera (English)
 Argentine Folk (Spanish)
 Folk of the North (Spanish)
 List of chacareras
 Structure of the dance
 National Institute of Musicology "Carlos Vega"

Latin American folklore
Argentine styles of music
Dance in Argentina
Argentine dances
Native American dances
19th-century music genres